Marcel Costly (born 20 November 1995) is a German professional footballer who plays as a right midfielder or right-back for FC Ingolstadt.

References

Living people
1995 births
German people of African-American descent
German people of American descent
German footballers
Association football defenders
Rotenburger SV players
1. FSV Mainz 05 II players
1. FC Magdeburg players
SV Waldhof Mannheim players
FC Ingolstadt 04 players
2. Bundesliga players
3. Liga players
Regionalliga players